In linear algebra, the Laplace expansion, named after Pierre-Simon Laplace, also called cofactor expansion, is an expression of the determinant of an  matrix  as a weighted sum of minors, which are the determinants of some  submatrices of . Specifically, for every ,

The Laplace expansion is often useful in proofs, as in, for example, allowing recursion on the size of matrices. It is also of didactic interest for its simplicity and as one of several ways to view and compute the determinant. For large matrices, it quickly becomes inefficient to compute when compared to Gaussian elimination.

Examples 
Consider the matrix

The determinant of this matrix can be computed by using the Laplace expansion along any one of its rows or columns. For instance, an expansion along the first row yields:

Laplace expansion along the second column yields the same result:

It is easy to verify that the result is correct: the matrix is singular because the sum of its first and third column is twice the second column, and hence its determinant is zero.

Proof

Suppose  is an n × n matrix and  For clarity we also label the entries of  that compose its  minor matrix  as

 for 

Consider the terms in the expansion of  that have  as a factor.  Each has the form

 

where  is a temporary shorthand notation for a cycle .
This operation decrements all indices larger than j so that every index fits in the set {1,2,...,n-1} 

Then  is expressed as 

Now, the operation which apply  first and then apply  is (Notice applying A before B is equivalent
to applying inverse of A to the upper row of B in two-line notation)

the operation which applies  first and then applies  is 

above two are equal thus,

Thus 
 

 

And since the map  is bijective,

from which the result follows.

Laplace expansion of a determinant by complementary minors
Laplace's cofactor expansion can be generalised as follows.

Example 
Consider the matrix

The determinant of this matrix can be computed by using the Laplace's cofactor expansion along the first two rows as follows. Firstly note that there are 6 sets of two distinct numbers in  namely let  be the aforementioned set.

By defining the complementary cofactors to be
 
 
and the sign of their permutation to be
 

The determinant of A can be written out as

In our explicit example this gives us

As above, it is easy to verify that the result is correct: the matrix is singular because the sum of its first and third column is twice the second column, and hence its determinant is zero.

General statement 

This coincides with the theorem above when . The same thing holds for any fixed  columns.

Computational expense
The following Python code implements Laplace expansion recursively:def determinant(M):
    # Base case of recursive function: 1x1 matrix
    if len(M) == 1: 
        return M[0][0]

    total = 0
    for column, element in enumerate(M[0]):
        # Exclude first row and current column.
        K = [x[:column] + x[column + 1 :] for x in M[1:]]
        s = 1 if column % 2 == 0 else -1 
        total += s * element * determinant(K)
    return total

See also

 Leibniz formula for determinants
 Rule of Sarrus for  determinants

References

 David Poole: Linear Algebra. A Modern Introduction. Cengage Learning 2005, pp. 265–267
 Harvey E. Rose: Linear Algebra. A Pure Mathematical Approach. Springer 2002, pp. 57–60

External links
 Laplace expansion in C 
 Laplace expansion in Java 
Matrix theory
Determinants
Articles containing proofs

de:Determinante#Laplacescher Entwicklungssatz